High School Musical: The Music in You is a documentary from filmmaker Barbara Kopple as she follows students from Arlington Heights and Western Hills High School in Fort Worth, Texas as they prepare to put on their version of the Disney hit High School Musical. The Summer Theatre show was directed by Ann Hunter and Julia Worthington. The production was attended by over 2800 people during its four-day run.  The documentary premiered in October 2007.

External links
 Cabin Creek Films

American documentary films
2007 films
Films directed by Barbara Kopple
Documentary films about high school in the United States
Films shot in Fort Worth, Texas
High School Musical (franchise)
2000s American films